Jayapura (formerly Dutch: Hollandia) is the capital and largest city of the Indonesian province of Papua. The city borders the Pacific Ocean and Yos Sudarso Bay to the north, the sovereign state of Papua New Guinea to the east, Keerom Regency to the south, and Jayapura Regency to the west.

With a population of 398,478 according to the 2020 census, Jayapura is the most populous city in the entire island of New Guinea, surpassing Port Moresby, the national capital of Papua New Guinea. It is also the fastest-growing city in Indonesia, with the population increasing by 55.23% since the previous census in 2010. The official estimate as at mid 2021 was 404,004.

Jayapura is the fourth largest city by economy in Eastern Indonesia—after Makassar, Denpasar, and Manado—with an estimated 2016 GDP at Rp19.48 trillion. As of 2017, it is also the second-most expensive Indonesian city to live in, after Jakarta. Jayapura has a very high Human Development Index (HDI) at 0.801.

Etymology
Jayapura is Sanskrit for "city of victory" (जय jaya: "victory"; पुर pura: "city") and was named by Suharto as part of the de-Sukarnoization. Nowadays there are calls from some citizens, government officials and academicians, to rename the city to better reflect the locals like the naming of Youtefa Bridge. Some suggestions include Kota Tabi as the city is in the customary region of Tabi, Port Numbay, or just Numbay as "Port" is English and not a native word. The word "Numbay" comes from the river Numbay which flows to the city. It has the meaning "clear water" while "Tabi" means "sunrise" in the local Kayo Pulau language.

During the Dutch colonial era the city was called Hollandia, based on the Holland region. In 1945, the Dutch made Hollandia the capital of then Netherlands New Guinea. After the territory was handed over to the United Nations Temporary Executive Authority, on 1 October 1962, the city went by a dual Dutch/Indonesian name: Hollandia/Kota Baru (New Town). When Indonesia took control over the city on 1 May 1963, it became solely Kota Baru. In 1964, the city was briefly renamed Sukarnopura, after then-President Sukarno, until the end of 1968, when it acquired its present name.

History

Before its inclusion into the colonial government of the Dutch Indies, the location of present-day Jayapura was known as Numbay. Before the arrival of the Dutch there was an active trade in Numbay, centered on the Island of Metui Debi and the area where the former Gereja Pengharapan ("Church of the Favor of God") stood, in Sam Ratulangi Road, being most active between 1897 and 1905. The mode of the trade was through barter for spices, cassava, salted fish and bird-of-paradise. The society of Numbay was led by an ondoafi (chief of the tribe). In the 1800's, Numbay maintained relations with the Ternate Sultanate.

On 28 September 1909, a detachment of the Dutch navy under Captain F.J.P. Sachse came ashore at Humboldt Bay near the mouth of the Numbay river. Their task was the systematic exploration of northern New Guinea and the search for a natural border between the Dutch and German spheres on New Guinea. Their camp along the river was called Kloofkamp, a name still in use as the name of an ancient district of Jayapura. Forty coconut trees were cut down for the establishment of the camp. They were bought from the owners at a cost of one rijksdaalder per palm.

On 7 March 1910, the Dutch flag was raised and the settlement was named Hollandia. On the other side of the bay there was already a German camp, Germania-Huk (German Corner), which is now uninhabited and part of Indonesian territory. Hollandia was the capital of a district of the same name in the northeast of West New Guinea. The name Hollandia was used until 1962.

The northern part of Netherlands New Guinea was occupied by Japanese forces in 1942. Allied forces drove out the Japanese after Operations Reckless and Persecution, the amphibious landings near Hollandia, from 21 April 1944. The area's Naval Base Hollandia, served as General Douglas MacArthur's headquarters until the conquest of the Philippines in March 1945. Over twenty U.S. bases were established and half a million US personnel moved through the area.

Jayapura was struck by the Aitape tsunami after the 1998 Papua New Guinea earthquake.

Geography and climate

Jayapura overlooks the Yos Sudarso Bay. Around 30% of the area is inhabited, with the remainder consisting of a rough terrain, swamps, and protected forest.

Jayapura has a tropical rainforest climate (Af) with heavy rainfall year-round.

Administrative districts

The city comprises five districts (kecamatan), tabulated below with their areas and their populations at the 2010 Census and the 2020 Census, together with the official estimates as at mid 2021. The table also lists the location of the district headquarters.

Note: (a) the original 2020 Census figures were quoted as 303,760; this was drastically revised to 398,478, but the figures for the individual five districts have not been revised.

Demographics
As the capital of Papua Province with all the development undertaken, Jayapura City has become a "magnet" for settlers from other regions of Indonesia. Ethnic Javanese, Makasar, Buginese, Torajanese, Manadonese, Bataks, Moluccans, Madurese and so on, among others ethnicities of the nation that helped increase the population drastically in at least one decade. In addition to the label "city of Education" then has made this city a destination for residents from outside the city of Jayapura to find a job and also gain knowledge in several institutions in this city.

Religion
On 12 May 1949, the Roman Catholic Apostolic Prefecture of Hollandia was established in the city. In 1963, it was renamed as the Apostolic Vicariate of Kota Baru. In 1964, it was again renamed as the Apostolic Vicariate of Sukarnapura.  It was promoted in 1966 as the Diocese of Sukarnapura, renamed in 1969 as the Diocese of Djajapura and since 1973 spelled as Diocese of Jayapura.

Economy 
 
The highest economic growth of Jayapura city compared to other districts/municipalities in the province of Papua has had implications for the increased income and purchasing power of the people. The economic growth is largely contributed from the tertiary sector, where trade and services and finance dominate its contribution to the formation of GRDP.

The sharp gap/disparity of income, and the high rate of poverty (28.44% at less than $3.10/day PPP) and unemployment rate with low labor force participation rate (57.26%). Another weakness is the not yet optimal use of agriculture (in the broad sense) as one of the supporters of the regional economy that has a competitive advantage. Tourism developments, marked by the growing tourism industry and domestic and foreign tourist arrivals in Jayapura City, have provided opportunities for various sectors to flourish, especially income generation for the indigenous people of Port Numbay in Jayapura city.

With the development of trade and service activities supported by the increasing availability of trade and service facilities that lead to increased private investment in the trade and tourism services sector and other sectors. This condition also needs to be supported by the protection policy for the indigenous people of Port Numbay to be prioritized in taking the opportunity to compete healthily, especially in the field of trade, investment and tourism sector.

The economic condition of the indigenous people of Port Numbay, particularly in the context of economic competition in the city of Jayapura, is still at a low level with the lack of capital and skills possessed and with increasingly depleted natural resources.

With the skills and knowledge that still rely on subsistence economic activities such as sago concocting activities, catching fish in the sea, shifting cultivation to indigenous people of Port Numbay, it is enough left behind with other ethnic in Jayapura city that competes in trade and service which is economic modern with profit from the subsistence economy. However, by utilizing the customary rights area along the coast that became the coastal tourist attraction, some of the inhabitants of Port Numbay Original have competed in the service sector even on a small scale and limited capital. This is done by indigenous villagers Kayu Batu on BaseG beach in North Jayapura, Hamadi beach in South Jayapura and on Holtekam beach, Skow Mabo and Skow in Muara Tami district.

While competition in the field of trade is still limited to the natives of Port Numbay because it is still in small scale and is subsistence economy. Among other things, the sale of crops such as marine fish, long-term crops such as coconut, areca nut and others that more levels of economic competition with other ethnic Jayapura in the same merchandise, and with a larger scale.

Transport

Jayapura is served by Sentani International Airport, located in Jayapura Regency near Lake Sentani.

A highway connects the city eastwards to Skouw, a village near the border with Papua New Guinea and continues beyond the border to Vanimo. The city has connection to other towns and cities such as Sarmi and Wamena via Trans-Papua Highway.

Bus terminals in Jayapura include Terminal Entrop and Terminal Mesran. Trans Jayapura bus rapid transit, operated by the city government via Pikoum cooperative, is operating within the city since 2019 with four corridors starting from both terminals.

The government is currently planning to build a railway from Jayapura to Sarmi. Further plans could connect Jayapura with Manokwari and Sorong. The project is planned for completion by 2030.

Sport
Jayapura is the home of the Persipura, a professional football club that has produced many famous Papuan-Indonesian footballers and have won the Liga Indonesia/Indonesia Super League four times in the 2005, 2008–09, 2010–11 and the 2012–13 seasons. Persipura plays its home matches in the Mandala Stadium.

Media
The main newspaper in Papua, Cenderawasih Pos, is published in Jayapura. Other notable local newspaper and online media such as Koran Jubi is also based in the city.

Jayapura also served by several radio and television station, including public stations RRI Jayapura and TVRI Papua as well as privately owned Jaya TV. Most national television networks coverage could be received in the city.

Twin towns and sister cities 

  Puerto Princesa, Philippines
  Quezon City, Philippines
  San José, Costa Rica
  Songkhla, Thailand

See also 

 Cenderawasih University
 Sentani Airport

References

External links 

 A small tour of Jayapura
 Expat Living in Jayapura, Irian Jaya
  Jayapura City Tourism – Papua Indonesia

 
Cities in Indonesia
Populated coastal places in Indonesia
Populated places in Papua (province)
Populated places established in 1910
Port cities and towns in Indonesia
Port cities in Oceania
Ports and harbors of the Pacific Ocean
Provincial capitals in Indonesia
1910 establishments in the Dutch East Indies